John Mascaro is a painter and self-taught architect working between New York and Los Angeles.

Mascaro graduated with an MFA  from the Slade School of Art in 2004. In 2008 he co-founded Mut-Architecture with Eleonore Morand after meeting at Acconci Studio in Brooklyn, NY.  Mut's projects blur the division between painting and architecture, as seen most specifically in their "Restaurant 51" project at the [Cinémathèque Française] in Paris, France, and the "South Bronx Igloo project" in which a large cardboard igloo was fabricated atop a roof in the South Bronx section of New York.

Mascaro's paintings and structural experiments have been exhibited at Haven Arts in the South Bronx, New York, and Le Carré Noir in France.

External links
The artist's website (www.johnmascaro.com)
http://www.treehugger.com/sustainable-product-design/crazycool-diy-idea-embed-vintage-furniture-in-plaster-photos.html
http://www.domusweb.it/en/search.html?type=tag&key=mut-architecture
http://www.designboom.com/architecture/mut-architecture-12-passive-houses/
http://www.designboom.com/architecture/mut-architecture-z-house/
http://www.designboom.com/architecture/mut-architecture-bar-le-cercle-paris/
https://www.yatzer.com/restaurant-de-la-cin%C3%A9math%C3%A8que-fran%C3%A7aise-mut-architecture
http://www.designboom.com/architecture/mut-architecture-restaurant-51-at-cinematheque-francaise-paris/l
http://www.framemag.com/index.php?module=news/556
http://lecarrenoir-art.blogspot.com/2010/10/journal-la-republique-les-oeuvres-de.html

20th-century American painters
American male painters
21st-century American painters
21st-century American male artists
American installation artists
People from the Bronx
1970s births
Living people
Alumni of the Slade School of Fine Art
Painters from New York City
American contemporary painters
20th-century American male artists